Coxen is a surname and refer to:

 Charles Coxen (1809-1876), Australian naturalist and politician
 Edward Coxen (1880-1954), English-born American actor
Elizabeth Coxen (1825–1906), Australian naturalist
 Elizabeth Coxen (1804-1841), maiden name of Elizabeth Gould, British artist and illustrator
 John Coxen (pirate) (active 1677-1682), more commonly referred to as John Coxon
 Walter Adams Coxen (1870-1949), Australian Army Major General in World War I

See also
 Coxen's Fig-Parrot, small Australian parrot named after Charles Coxen
 Cock
 Cocks
 Cox
 Coxe
 Coxon